Chilgok-Unam Station is a station of the Daegu Metro Line 3 in Guam-dong, Buk District, Daegu, South Korea.

External links 
 
 

Daegu Metro stations
Buk District, Daegu
Daegu Metro Line 3
Railway stations opened in 2015